Neulengbach is a railway station serving Neulengbach in Lower Austria. It is the western terminus Vienna S-Bahn line S50.

In 2020, the Austrian Federal Railways (OEBB) invested 7.1 million euros to make Neulengbach Station more accessible. The OEBB installed lifts and access ramps. The modernisation has also included installation of new platform roofs and waiting rooms on both platforms.

References 

Railway stations in Lower Austria
Austrian Federal Railways